James Stanley, 10th Earl of Derby  (3 July 16641 February 1736), styled The Honourable until 1702, was a British peer, soldier and politician.

Early life
Derby was the second son of Charles Stanley, 8th Earl of Derby, and Dorothea Helena Kirkhoven, born on 3 July 1664. He was elected to the House of Commons for Clitheroe in 1685, a seat he held until 1689, and then represented Preston from 1689 to 1690 and Lancashire from 1695 to 1702. He held the post of Groom of the Bedchamber to King William III from 1689 to 1702.

Military career
Having served in the Anglo-Dutch Brigade with William III in Holland and Flanders (1686–8), he was commissioned as a Captain and Lieutenant-Colonel in the 1st Foot Guards on 11 April 1689. When his elder brother, the 9th Earl of Derby, as Lord Lieutenant of Lancashire was ordered to call out the Lancashire Militia, Lt-Col James Stanley commanded the brigade (three regiments of foot and three troops of horse) in the subsequent campaign in Ireland in 1690–91. When the Lancashire Militia returned home to be disembodied at the end of the campaign, and Stanley was ordered to Flanders to join Colonel Hodges' Regiment as second-in-command, he induced a large number of his militiamen to volunteer to fill vacancies in the regiment. After Col Hodges was killed at the Battle of Steenkerque in 1692, Stanley succeeded to the command, and the regiment became 'Stanleys' (later the Bedfordshire and Hertfordshire Regiment). He remained its colonel until 1705. He was promoted to major general in 1704.

Political career
In 1702, he succeeded his elder brother as 10th Earl of Derby and entered the House of Lords. In 1732, he succeeded his great-niece as sixth Baron Strange. Derby was admitted to the Privy Council in 1706 and appointed Chancellor of the Duchy of Lancaster, a position he retained until 1710, and was later Captain of the Yeomen of the Guard from 1715 to 1723. He also served as Lord Lieutenant of Lancashire during 1702–1710 and 1714–1736.

Family life
In February 1705 he married Mary Morley, only daughter of Sir William Morley of Halnaker and his second wife Anne Denham, daughter of the celebrated poet Sir John Denham and his first wife Anne Cotton. He died on 1 February 1736, aged 68, without surviving issue (his only son, William, born 31 January 1710, died on 4 March following). The Earl was succeeded in the earldom by his distant relative Edward Stanley, 11th Earl of Derby. The barony of Strange and lordship of the Isle of Man ('Lord of Mann') passed on to his first cousin once removed, James Murray, 2nd Duke of Atholl. Lady Derby died on 29 March 1752.

Notes

References
 Burke's Peerage, Baronetage and Knightage, 100th Edn, London, 1953.
 John Childs, The Nine Years War and the British Army 1688–97: The Operations in the Low Countries, Manchester: University Press, 1991, .
 J.B.M. Frederick, Lineage Book of British Land Forces 1660–1978, Vol I, Wakefield: Microform Academic, 1984, .
 Kidd, Charles, Williamson, David (editors). Debrett's Peerage and Baronetage (1990 edition). New York: St Martin's Press, 1990, 
 Maj R.J.T. Williamson & Col J. Lawson Whalley, History of the Old County Regiment of Lancashire Militia, London: Simpkin, Marshall, 1888.
 
 

|-

|-

1664 births
1736 deaths
Lord-Lieutenants of Lancashire
Members of the Privy Council of England
James
English MPs 1685–1687
English MPs 1689–1690
English MPs 1690–1695
English MPs 1695–1698
English MPs 1698–1700
English MPs 1701
English MPs 1701–1702
People of Byzantine descent
10
Monarchs of the Isle of Man
Members of the Parliament of England (pre-1707) for Lancashire
Barons Strange
Lancashire Militia officers
Chancellors of the Duchy of Lancaster